Tyler Kepkay (born June 19, 1987) is a Canadian professional basketball player, who last played for the Winling Basketball Club in Hong Kong. He is a veteran member of the Canadian national basketball team.

College career 
Kepkay initially attended the College of Eastern Utah in Price, Utah.  At the junior college school, he led the nation in scoring his sophomore season en route to being named First Team Junior College All-America.  Following his two years of junior college, he committed to the University of Utah for his last two years of eligibility.  In his first season with the Utes, he played in all 33 games, starting 26 of them, while averaging 7.5 points and 2.1 assists per game.  In the 2008–09 season, he averaged 10.3 points per game for the Utes in helping the team to a 24–9 record and a berth in the 2009 NCAA Men's Division I Basketball Tournament.  At the tournament, he scored a team-high 19 points in a first round loss to the University of Arizona.

National team career 
Kepkay first played for the Canada national basketball team at the FIBA World Olympic Qualifying Tournament for Men 2008 while seeing limited action off the bench for the Canadians.  He also participated with the team at the FIBA Americas Championship 2009.

References

External links 
Utah Utes profile

1987 births
Living people
Artland Dragons players
Basketball people from British Columbia
Canadian expatriate basketball people in Germany
Canadian expatriate basketball people in the United States 
Canadian men's basketball players
ETB Wohnbau Baskets players
Giessen 46ers players
Point guards
Science City Jena players
Basketball players from Vancouver
Utah State Eastern Golden Eagles men's basketball players
Utah Utes men's basketball players